The Empire State is the official nickname of New York State, in the United States of America. Empire State may also refer to:

Geography
 Georgia (U.S. state), nicknamed "Empire State of the South"
 Inland Empire State, an old nickname for Illinois

Arts, entertainment, and media

Films
 Empire State (1987 film), a British film about gang warfare
 Empire State (2013 film), an American heist film

Music
 "Empire State", a song by Fleetwood Mac from their album Mirage (1982)
 "Empire State (Son House in Excelsis)", a song by Mercury Rev from their album See You on the Other Side (1995)
 "Empire State", a song by Guster from their album Ganging Up on the Sun (2006)
 Empire State, a 2007 hip hop album by Vast Aire and Karniege
 "Empire State of Mind", a song by Jay-Z and Alicia Keys from The Blueprint 3 (2009)

Other uses in arts, entertainment, and media
 Empire State, a nation in the fictional universe of Crimson Skies
 Empire State, a 2012 science fiction novel by Adam Christopher
 The Empire State (audio play), an audio play by Big Finish productions

Buildings
 Empire State Building, skyscraper in New York City, one of the tallest buildings in the world
 Empire State Plaza, state office complex in Albany, New York

Education
 Empire State College a state college in New York
 T.S. Empire State VI, a U.S. training vessel operated by the State University of New York Maritime College

See also
 List of U.S. state nicknames